The Pugu Forest Reserve is a forest reserve in Pwani Region, Tanzania. It is in the Pugu Hills area, near Dar es Salaam, adjacent to the Kazimzumbwi Forest Reserve. Together with Kazimzumbwi, the Pugu Forest (previously known as Mogo Forest) is part of what is considered to be one of the oldest forests in the world. The area is characterized by a large variety of endemic species of animals and plants.

Location 

The 22 km2 reserve extends over a large hilly area south-west of Dar es Salaam, the nearest populated place being Kisarawe. The source of the Msimbazi river, that flows into the Indian Ocean in the surroundings of Dar, is inside the reserve. The reserve borders both the Kazimzumbwi Reserve and the Selous Game Reserve. A large fraction of its vegetation is composed of evergreen plants, as rain is common and abundant throughout most of the year. One of the largest kaolinite deposits in the world is located inside the reserve.

Environment 

The Pugu Forest has 14 endemic plant species, two mammalian endemic species, and one endemic subspecies of birds. Wildlife include elephants, Masai giraffes, impalas, common warthogs, African leopards, cheetahs, spotted hyenas, pangolins, elephant shrews, mongooses, civets, galagos, side-striped jackals, black-backed jackals, baboons, hippopotamuses, colobuses, as well as over 80 species of birds. Lions used to live in the reserve, but none has been reported in recent times. Some natural and human-made caves host large colonies of bats, such as horseshoe bat, Tanzanian woolly bat and Hildegarde's tomb bat.

Tourism 
Despite not being part of traditional touristic routes, the Reserve has a fair number of visitors per year, mainly because of its proximity to Dar es Salaam and the Julius Nyerere International Airport (20 minutes drive from the park). Trekking paths have been traced in the Reserve, leading to its main attractions, including a cave that is a sacred place to the Zaramo people, a colorful local cattle market, and some bat-populated caves (these are especially fascinating at sunset, when bat fly out of the cave in large flocks). With the permission of the Ministry of Natural Resources camping should be possible in reserve, in Pugu Kajiungeni the Pugu Hills Nature Centre a small private lodge offers the artist house, four huts on poles and opportunity for camping.

Development 
The fees for the reserve are around 2 US dollars for Tanzanian citizens and 30 US dollars for foreigners (National Entrance Rate), permits can be obtained at the Ministry of Natural Resources or the Forestry office in Kisarawe town. Hiking is also possible in the hills outside the reserve.

References

External links 
 Pugu Forest
 Pugu Hills Forest Reserve

Nature reserves in Tanzania
Geography of Pwani Region
Forest reserves of Tanzania
Tourist attractions in the Pwani Region